The 1983 Monegasque municipal elections were held on 8 February to elect the 15 members of the Communal Council of Monaco.

Electoral system
The 15 councillors were elected for a four-year period in a single multi-member constituency using plurality-at-large voting with a two-round system. A majority of the votes was required to be elected. The second round would have been held one week after the first round.
The Mayor of Monaco was elected by the councillors after the election.
Candidates were required to be at least 21 years old and to have the Monegasque nationality for at least 5 years.

Results

Following the election, Jean-Louis Médecin was reelected mayor.

References

1983
1983 elections in Europe
Municipal election
February 1983 events in Europe